Robert Abajyan (16 November 1996 – 2 April 2016) was an Armenian junior sergeant in the Republic of Artsakh Defense Army. He was posthumously awarded the "Hero of Artsakh" which is the highest honorary title of semi-recognized NKR.

Abajyan fought alone for several hours against special forces groups of the Azerbaijani Armed Forces during the Armenian–Azerbaijani clashes of 2016 in the northeast line of contact on the night of 1–2 April.  He gestured as if to surrender, and then pulled out a  grenade and blew up the approaching Azeri soldiers with himself.

Biography

Early life
Abajyan was born in 1996 in Yerevan. In 2003 he attended Yerevan's Basic School No. 147 in Kanaker-Zeytun District. He graduated in 2012 and attended Yerevan State Basic Medical College which he graduated in 2014 with a degree in dental technology. He then attended Medical Institute named after Mother Teresa later same year.

Military service
Abajyan went to compulsory military service in 2014. Due to high military performance, he was promoted to junior sergeant.

Armenian–Azerbaijani clashes
On the night of 1–2 April 2016 along the northeastern part of the NKR-Azerbaijan contact line units of Azerbaijani Armed Forces carried out large-scale attacks against the Armenian side. After the use of artillery, groups of Azerbaijani forces commenced an infantry attack. Under the leadership of captain Armenak Urfanyan, a smaller number of Armenian border soldiers started to provide heavy resistance. After two failed attempts of penetration and a loss of a tank, Azeri forces withdrew to their initial positions and resumed the artillery bombardments on the contact line. Captain Urfanyan and Yazidi-Armenian machine-gunner Kyaram Sloyan were soon killed.

After the death of the commander, Robert Abajyan, who had suffered a wound in his leg by that time, took upon himself to proceed with the resistance. After the penetration of Azeri forces inside the line, he brought his wounded comrade machine-gunner Andranik Zohrabyan into the trench cell, which was located at a distance of 30 meters (98 feet).

In the trench cell Abajyan contacts with the battalion commander and provides valuable information on the operational situation. He informed about possible dangers to the commander of the group that hurried to aid. After Andranik Zohrabyan bled to death, Abajyan continued to fight alone from the cell against a large number of enemy forces. After spotting the approaching Azeri soldiers, he attracted their attention by raising his hands and pretended to surrender, while secretly keeping an exposed hand grenade.

Allowing 2 Azeri soldiers to approach, Abajyan blew himself up with a grenade committing suicide. It's not clear if he could kill or wound any enemy soldier with his action. Having made that decision, he radioed in and said, as a last request, "Under no circumstances are you to abandon this position!"

On 8 April, after a mutual agreement was reached in advance between both parties, bodies of Abajyan and Zohrabyan were found as a result of body searching operations.

Funeral 
On 11 April 2016, Abajyan was buried in the Yerablur Military Pantheon. Funeral ceremonies were held in front of St. John the Baptist Church in Yerevan.

Hero of Artsakh 
Abajyan was posthumously awarded the highest Honorary Title "Hero of Artsakh" and the Order of the "Golden Eagle", "for exclusive bravery and courage shown during the defense of the NKR state border in the course of the large-scale military operations from 2 to 5 April". He became the 24th "Hero of Artsakh" awardee, as well as the youngest person ever to hold the title at 19 years old.

References

External links

1996 births
2016 deaths
Military personnel from Yerevan
Armenian military personnel killed in action
Burials at Yerablur
Artsakh military personnel
2016 Nagorno-Karabakh clashes